In algebraic geometry, a cubic threefold is a hypersurface of degree 3 in 4-dimensional projective space.  Cubic threefolds are all unirational, but  used intermediate Jacobians to show that non-singular cubic threefolds  are not rational.  The space of lines on a non-singular cubic 3-fold is a Fano surface.

Examples
Koras–Russell cubic threefold
Klein cubic threefold
Segre cubic

References

Algebraic varieties
3-folds